West Seneca is a town in Erie County, New York, United States. The population was 44,711 at the 2010 census. West Seneca is a centrally located interior town of the county, and a suburb of Buffalo. West Seneca, Orchard Park and Hamburg form the inner "Southtowns", a cluster of middle-class suburban towns.

History
Because the town is on land of the former Buffalo Creek Reservation, it was not open to white settlement until the mid-19th century.

In 1851, the town of Seneca was formed from parts of the towns of Cheektowaga and Hamburg. The town changed the name to "West Seneca" in 1852 to avoid confusion with the town of Seneca in Ontario County, New York. In 1909 the area immediately south of Buffalo split from West Seneca, becoming the city of Lackawanna. Following election day in 2019, the town elected a Republican Town Supervisor for the first time in 50 years and first town board member in 13 years, despite having a two to one Democrat to Republican ratio among registered voters (a Democrat running as an Independent also ran in the Supervisorial race).

The Eaton Site was listed on the National Register of Historic Places in 1979. The Community of True Inspiration Residence was listed in 2013.

Quality of life
West Seneca offers a community-rich suburban lifestyle. The town and local businesses sponsor a large number of family oriented community events and festivals. The town has an extensive system of recreational facilities, including 15 town parks, an indoor skating rink, swimming center, youth community center and a large soccer complex. The town is home to the Charles E. Burchfield Nature & Art Center. The 7.2 million dollar Southtowns Family YMCA Facility opened in 2003. A recreational bicycle and pedestrian trail tentatively named the Seneca Creek Pathway is planned.

West Seneca was named "The best place in New York State to raise kids" by Bloomberg Businessweek in 2010.

Places of interest
Downtown Buffalo and its cultural offerings are located approximately 12 minutes' drive to the west, while both the American and Canadian sides of Niagara Falls are about a 35-minute drive to the northwest.

The Charles E. Burchfield Nature & Art Center is located in West Seneca. Developed in 1999, the  art and nature center complex also contains wild and cultivated gardens, a large playground, nature trails, playgrounds, and an outdoor amphitheater alongside the banks of Buffalo Creek.

West Seneca is home to a variety of shopping centers, with one of the most popular being the Southgate Plaza. The McKinley Mall in Hamburg and Walden Galleria in Cheektowaga are both within a 15-minute drive. The town was once home to one of the largest malls in the area, the Seneca Mall.

Schwabl's, a restaurant staple, has been located in West Seneca since 1942. Famous for their beef on weck, the restaurant was featured in a 2009 episode of Anthony Bourdain: No Reservations.

Mayer Bros. Cider Mill began operation in 1852 by Jacob Mayer. The business is still family-owned, with some operations still housed in the original building.

Education
There are three separate public school districts within the town. The West Seneca Central School District is the largest and serves the entirety of the town. It also serves small portions of the southern parts of Cheektowaga and South Buffalo, the northern portion of Orchard Park, and the eastern area of Lackawanna.

West Seneca is home to the following private primary and secondary schools:
 Fourteen Holy Helpers School (closed June 27, 2014)
 Queen of Heaven School
 The Center Road Christian Academy,
 Trinity Christian School
 St. John Vianney School
 West Seneca Christian School
 Our Lady of the Sacred Heart School (closed June 27, 2014; The school had its main building in the Orchard Park district and the junior high building in the West Seneca district, both physically in the town of Orchard Park near the Hamburg town and Lackawanna city lines.)

Houghton College used to have a branch campus in the town that also served as the central office for its Extension Studies program.

Geography

The New York State Thruway (Interstate 90) passes through the town and intersects New York State Route 400 (Aurora Expressway) in the northwestern part of the town and U.S. Route 219 in the southwestern section. The east town line is marked by New York State Route 78 (Transit Road). New York State Route 240 (Harlem Road/Orchard Park Road) and New York State Route 277 (Union Road) are other major north-south roads, while New York State Route 16 (Seneca Street/Center Road) and New York State Route 354 (Clinton Street) are major east-west highways.

Adjacent cities and towns

Town of Cheektowaga - north
City of Buffalo - northwest
City of Lackawanna - west
Town of Hamburg - southwest
Town of Orchard Park - south
Town of Elma - east
Town of Lancaster - northeast

Major highways in the Town of West Seneca

  Interstate 90 (New York State Thruway) passes through the western part of town in a north-south direction. (Overall Thruway direction is east-west.)
 U.S. Route 219 (Southern Expressway), north-south route that travels through the extreme southwestern corner of town and ends at I-90. It is a major traffic artery for Buffalo–Springville traffic and other points south.
 U.S. Route 20 (Transit Rd., Southwestern Blvd.), north-south route that forms the east town boundary as Transit Road, with NY 78 north of Seneca Street (NY 16) and without NY 78 north of the Orchard Park Border. US 20 then turns west along the Orchard Park border and forms the southern town border for a short while.
 New York State Route 16 (Seneca St., Center Rd.) passes through the town east-west from Buffalo into Elma. (Overall direction of NY 16 is north-south.)
 New York State Route 78 (Transit Rd.), north-south route that marks the east town line with US 20 north of Seneca Street (NY 16).
 New York State Route 240 (Harlem Rd., Orchard Park Rd.), north-south route through town from Cheektowaga to Orchard Park.
 New York State Route 277 (Union Rd.), north-south highway through town from Cheektowaga to Orchard Park.
 New York State Route 354 (Clinton St.), east-west roadway through north part of town from Buffalo to Elma.
 New York State Route 400 (Aurora Expwy.), east-west highway through the town from its west end at I-90, east into Elma that roughly parallels NY 16.

Demographics

As of the census of 2010, there were 44,711 people, 19,151 households, and 12,223 families residing in the town.  The population density was 2,148.8 people per square mile (829.7/km2).  There were 18,982 housing units at an average density of 888.2 per square mile (343.0/km2).  The racial makeup of the town was 97.96% White, 0.85% Black or African American, 0.21% Native American, 0.62% Asian, 0.01% Pacific Islander, 0.29% from other races, and 0.77% from two or more races. Hispanic or Latino of any race were 1.67% of the population.

There were 19,151 households, out of which 28.2% had children under the age of 18 living with them, 56.2% were married couples living together, 10.3% had a female householder with no husband present, and 30.5% were non-families. 26.6% of all households were made up of individuals, and 13.1% had someone living alone who was 65 years of age or older.  The average household size was 2.47 and the average family size was 3.02.

As of the census of 2000 the population was spread out, with 22.3% under the age of 18, 6.9% from 18 to 24, 27.2% from 25 to 44, 25.4% from 45 to 64, and 18.2% who were 65 years of age or older.  The median age was 41 years. For every 100 females, there were 91.0 males.  For every 100 females age 18 and over, there were 88.3 males.

The median income for a household in the town was $46,278, and the median income for a family was $54,179. Males had a median income of $39,003 versus $26,846 for females. The per capita income for the town was $20,529.  About 3.0% of families and 4.6% of the population were below the poverty line, including 5.1% of those under age 18 and 4.7% of those age 65 or over.

Communities and locations in West Seneca
Buffalo Airfield (9G0) – A general aviation airport on the north town line.
Buffalo Creek – A stream flowing westward through the town. The name of the city of Buffalo is derived from the stream. The creek is called the "Buffalo River" as it departs the western edge of the town.
East Seneca – A location on Route 16 in the east part of the town.
Ebenezer – Centrally located, a hamlet named after the Ebenezer Society (also called the Community of True Inspiration), a group of German Lutherans who purchased land and settled this area around 1843.  Later, many of this communal group moved to Amana, Iowa, and had abandoned their four settlements in West Seneca by 1863.
French Quarters – A location in the northwest part of the town.
Gardenville – A hamlet on the northern border of the town shared with the town of Cheektowaga.
New Ebenezer – A hamlet east of Gardenville.
Tim Russert Park – A park named after NBC journalist Tim Russert, who attended elementary school in West Seneca. It is currently used by South Buffalo Rugby.
West Seneca Census-Designated Place – Census designation that corresponds to the entire town of West Seneca.
West Seneca Developmental Center – A closed State facility for people with developmental disabilities in the southeast part of the town. It is still headquarters of the Western New York DDSO.
Western New York Children's Psychiatric Center - a State facility for mentally disturbed children and adolescents. Co-located with the now closed West Seneca Developmental Center.

Notable people
Matt Anderson, professional volleyball player
Jordan Buckley, Keith Buckley and Stephen Micciche of rock band Every Time I Die
Charles E. Burchfield, painter and visionary artist who lived in West Seneca for 42 years
Vincent J. Graber Sr., former New York State Assemblyman 
Jeremy Kelley, NFL wide receiver
Christian Metz, Inspirationalist who helped found the hamlet of Ebenezer
Aaron Miller, former NHL player who grew up in West Seneca
Chris Mueller, NHL player who grew up in West Seneca
Tina Parol, singer-songwriter
Brian Roloff, professional hockey player
Tim Russert, NBC journalist who attended elementary school in West Seneca
Lee Stempniak, current NHL player who grew up in West Seneca
Justin Strzelczyk, former NFL player who grew up in West Seneca
Robby Takac, bassist for the Goo Goo Dolls
Sandra Lee Wirth, former New York State Assemblywoman

Gallery

Related links
West Seneca Central School District serves West Seneca and parts of Cheektowaga, Orchard Park and Hamburg.

References

External links

 Town of West Seneca official website
 
 West Seneca Comprehensive Plan
 West Seneca history

Buffalo–Niagara Falls metropolitan area
Towns in Erie County, New York